Qʼeqchiʼ (Kʼekchiʼ in the former orthography, or simply Kekchi in many English-language contexts, such as in Belize) are a Maya people of Guatemala and Belize. Their indigenous language is the Qʼeqchiʼ language.

Before the beginning of the Spanish conquest of Guatemala in the 1520s, Qʼeqchiʼ settlements were concentrated in what are now the departments of Alta Verapaz and Baja Verapaz. Over the course of the succeeding centuries a series of land displacements, resettlements, persecutions and migrations resulted in a wider dispersal of Qʼeqchiʼ communities into other regions of Guatemala (Izabal, Petén, El Quiché), southern Belize (Toledo District), and smaller numbers in southern Mexico (Chiapas, Campeche). While most notably present in northern Alta Verapaz and southern Petén, contemporary Qʼeqchiʼ language-speakers are the most widely spread geographically of all Maya peoples  in Guatemala.

History 
Not much is known about the lives and history of the Qʼeqchiʼ people prior to being conquered by Spanish conquistadors; however, it is known that they were a Maya group located in the central highlands and northern lowlands of Guatemala. Their land was formerly known as Tezulutlan or “the land of war" and the Qʼeqchiʼ people were ruled by a king and had their own laws and government. When the Spanish began their conquest, the Qʼeqchiʼ were hard to control due to a dispersed population.  Bartolomé de las Casas was given permission to try to convert the Qʼeqchiʼ people to Christianity, however, only a small portion was converted and the church lost all ability to govern the Qʼeqchiʼ. This led to the exploitation of the Qʼeqchiʼ by plantation owners and slavers.

During the nineteenth-century plantation agriculture was a big part of the Qʼeqchiʼ people's lives. This led to the seizure of the Qʼeqchiʼ's communal land by plantations and the service of the Qʼeqchiʼ to farm the plantations. By 1877, all communal landownership was abolished by the government which edged some of the Qʼeqchiʼ to move to Belize. This seizure of communal land along with the effects of the Spanish Conquest created long-lasting poverty in the Qʼeqchiʼ people.

Religion and culture

Religion 
Traditionally the Qʼeqchiʼ people believe in the Tzuultaqʼa” which are the gods of the mountains and valleys. However, they have mixed those beliefs with the beliefs of the Catholic church. Some of the Qʼeqchiʼ believe in the Christian God and celebrate those who hold to Roman Catholicism the saints. They also believe that Tzuultaqʼaʼ presides over nature and dwells in the caves of the mountains. They also have three specific religious specialists that are from the Tzuultaqʼaʼ side of their religion. There are the ilonel which are the curers who use different types of herbs and ceremonies. The aj ke (seers) who advise and predict things in the village. The last is the aj tul which are believed to be the sorcers who can cast spells. They also believe in similar rituals to those in other Latin American countries like the celebration of the Day of the Dead. They also prefer a ritual to the dead which consists of wrapping the body in a petite which is a straw mat. They are then buried with items they would need for the journey into the afterlife.

Marriage 
Marriage in the Qʼeqchiʼ culture is not so different from the culture of arranged marriages in the Hindu religion. Marriages are arranged by the parents of the children. The parents of both children meet over time and if all goes well the children are married. This happens at the ages of 12 to 15 for the women and 15 to 18 for the males. After that the family would look very similar to the normal family picture; a mother, a father, and  a couple of children. When it comes to inheritance parents usually give the property and assets to the child who offers to care for the parents during their life.

Food and agriculture 
The agricultural production of the Qʼeqchiʼ people consists mostly of subsistence farming. This means they only farm for the needs of their families not external markets. At first the Qʼeqchiʼ were polycultural. The plants they farmed were edible weeds, banana plants, and other companion crops.  They also acquire some of their food from wild plants and some villages still hunt. However for most present day Qʼeqchiʼ people today their food comes from the corn fields. This comes mainly from a time where plantations dominated the Qʼeqchiʼ society. From the 1880s to around the 1940s the plantation owners forbid the growing of any crops other than corn and beans, so they could easily identify which crops belonged to them. This created a corn-dependent diet of the Qʼeqchiʼ people.

While corn doesn't prove very profitable for the Qʼeqchiʼ economy or their diet it does have other merits. The Qʼeqchiʼ use agriculture as a way to commune with God the creator in a very physical and spiritual way. It was a way to feel like a co-creator when planting new life into the soil. All the parts of planting, cultivating, and harvesting are all rituals and worship in their religion.

Contemporary Issues 
The QHA, which is the Qʼeqchiʼ Healers Association, are an association of indigenous healers that have come together to share their forms of conservation and botany.  The QHA along with the Belize Indigenous Training Institute funded a project which would develop a traditional healing garden and culture center. Here the Qʼeqchiʼ Healers shared their similar methods that had been passed down to them in the hopes of preserving rare plant life and educating their community. They are preserving the biodiversity of their region by coming up with different options other than wild harvesting as well as was to propagate and cultivate many rare plant species.

Notable members
Cristina Coc, led 39 villages in Southern Belize in attaining a landmark ruling on the rights to their traditional lands and receipt of the Equator Prize
Rodrigo Tot, awarded the Goldman Environment Prize in 2017
 Oscar Santis

Notes

References
 
 
 
 
 
 Wilson, Michael Robert  |year=1972 |title=Highland Maya People and Their Habitat | Ph.D. dissertation | http://www.quantamike.ca/content/phd.html

Indigenous peoples in Guatemala
Alta Verapaz Department
Baja Verapaz Department
Izabal Department
Petén Department
Quiché Department
Maya peoples
Mesoamerican cultures
Indigenous peoples in Belize
Toledo District
Indigenous peoples in Honduras
Indigenous peoples in Mexico